This is a list of animated feature films that were released in 2020.

Highest-grossing animated films
The following is a list of the 10 highest-grossing animated feature films first released in 2020.

The year was severely impacted by the COVID-19 pandemic which led to a major decline in box office revenue due to the closure of cinemas and movie theaters. For the first time in box office history, two non-American animated film productions (Asian films), Demon Slayer: Mugen Train from Japan and Jiang Ziya from China, have become the highest-grossing animated films of the year. It is also the first time since 1987 that a non-American animated film (Japanese anime), Demon Slayer: Mugen Train, became the highest-grossing animated film of the year, and the first time an anime has made the top 10 highest-grossing films of the year worldwide.

2020 was also the first year since 2014 to not have an animated film gross $700, $800, $900 million and $1 billion, the first year since 2005 to not have an animated film gross $600 million.

Demon Slayer: Kimetsu no Yaiba the Movie: Mugen Train, It set the all-time box office records for the highest-grossing Japanese film, the highest-grossing anime film, and the highest-grossing R-rated animated film. It went on to have the highest-grossing second weekend, and in ten days became the fastest film to cross , surpassing Spirited Away (2001) which had previously crossed the  milestone in 19 days and held the record for 19 years. Mugen Train also became the fastest film to cross  in Japan, again faster than Spirited Away. It also set the record for the highest-grossing IMAX release in Japan, surpassing the previous record holder Bohemian Rhapsody (2018). In 59 days, Mugen Train set another record as the fastest film to cross the  milestone, faster than Spirited Away which took 253 days to reach the same milestone. In 66 days, the film set another record as the first film to top the Japanese box office charts for ten straight weekends (since the charts began publication in 2004). In 73 days, Mugen Train grossed  to become the highest-grossing film of all time in Japan, surpassing Spirited Away which held the record for 19 years.

Notes

References

2020
 Feature films
2020-related lists